Joseph Gibson Hoyt (January 19, 1815 – November 26, 1862) was the first chancellor and a professor of Greek at Washington University in St. Louis (then named Washington Institute in St. Louis) from 1858 to 1862. Born in Dunbarton, New Hampshire in 1815, Hoyt received his undergraduate education at Yale University, where he was a member of Skull and Bones. After Hoyt's graduation from Yale in 1840, he served as an instructor in mathematics and natural philosophy at Phillips Exeter Academy from 1840 to 1858, before taking up his post at Washington University. In 1862, Hoyt died in St. Louis, Missouri at the age of 47.

Hoyt Hall, a dormitory at Phillips Exeter Academy, is named for Hoyt. A large plaque on the building reads, "In memory of Joseph Gibson Hoyt, the great teacher."

External links
Washington University in St. Louis
Biographical entry at Washington University in St. Louis

1815 births
1862 deaths
Chancellors of Washington University in St. Louis
Yale University alumni
Phillips Exeter Academy faculty
People from Dunbarton, New Hampshire
Washington University in St. Louis mathematicians
Washington University in St. Louis faculty
Mathematicians from New Hampshire